Bronin  is a village in the administrative district of Gmina Stryków, within Zgierz County, Łódź Voivodeship, in central Poland.

The village has a population of 50.

References

Bronin